Phalera is a genus of moths of the family Notodontidae.

The scientific name is derived from the Greek phaleros (with a white marking) and refers to the white spot on the apex of the forewings.

Species
 Phalera acutoides Holloway, 1983.
 Phalera albizzae Mell, 1931.
 Phalera albocalceolata (Bryk, 1950).
 Phalera alpherakyi Leech, 1898.
 Phalera amboinae (Felder, 1861).
 Phalera angustipennis Matsumura, 1919.
 Phalera argenteolepis Schintlmeister, 1997.
 Phalera assimilis (Bremer & Grey, 1852).
 Phalera banksi Holloway, 1983.
 Phalera bucephala (Linnaeus, 1758).
 Phalera bucephalina (Staudinger et Rebel, 1901).
 Phalera bucephaloides (Ochsenheimer, 1810).
 Phalera combusta (Walker, 1855).
 Phalera cossioides Walker, 1863.
 Phalera eminens Schintlmeister, 1997.
 Phalera erconvalda (Schaus, ?1928).
 Phalera flavescens (Bremer et Gery, 1852).
 Phalera goniophora Hampson, 1910.
 Phalera grotei Moore, 1859.
 Phalera hadrian Schintlmeister, 1989.
 Phalera huangtiao Schintlmeister et Fang, 2001.
 Phalera javana Moore, 1859.
 Phalera mangholda (Schaus, 1928).
 Phalera minor Nagano, 1916.
 Phalera niveomaculata Kiriakoff, 1963.
 Phalera obscura Wileman, 1910.
 Phalera ora Schintlmeister, 1989.
 Phalera ordgara Schaus, 1928.
 Phalera parivala Moore, 1859.
 Phalera raya Moore, 1849.
 Phalera sangana Moore, 1859.
 Phalera sebrus Schintlmeister, 1989.
 Phalera styx Holloway, 1983.
 Phalera sundana Holloway, 1982.
 Phalera surigaona Schaus.
 Phalera takasagoensis Matsumura, 1919.
 Phalera torpida Walker, 1865.
 Phalera wanqu Schintlmeister et Fang, 2001

Notodontidae